Pierini is a surname. Notable people with the surname include:

 Alessandro Pierini (born 1973), Italian retired footballer
 Gabriel Pierini (born 2000), Brazilian footballer
 Gastone Pierini (1899–1967), Italian lightweight weightlifter
 Nicholas Pierini (born 1998), Italian footballer
 Nicolette Pierini (born 2003), American child actress and performer

See also 

 Pierini (disambiguation)
 Perino (surname)